Mondo Magneto is the debut studio Rock album by Brian Ray, released on October 16, 2006 through his independent record label Whooray Records.

Background
After decades of performing, writing and recording with musical artists, Brian Ray, a guitarist/songwriter/singer/producer released his first solo album, Mondo Magneto. "People have always asked me when I was going to do my own thing," Ray said, "I guess I was just busy." 

Unlike other albums, Mondo Magneto was recorded on analog, then moved over to digital for further editing.

When he asked the blues singer Etta James if she would sing with him on the album her answer was simple - and immediate - "I'll do anything for Brian."

Musicians on Mondo Magneto include Scott Shriner from Weezer, Davey Faragher from Elvis Costello's band, as well as Abe Laboriel, Jr., Wix Wickens and Rusty Anderson from Paul McCartney's band. The record release party was held at The Mint in Los Angeles, California on January 21, 2006.

Track listing
1. Good For Nothing - 3:21 (Brian Ray)
Brian Ray - Vocals, Harmonies, Electric Guitars, Omnicord
Matt Laug - Drums
Scott Shriner - Backing Vocals
Abe Laboriel Jr. - Backing Vocals, Tambourine
Oliver Leiber - Roland CR-8000
2. Vinyl - 3:35 (Brian Ray/Oliver Leiber)
Brian Ray - Vocals, Guitar, Slide Guitar
Abe Laboriel Jr. - Drums, Backing Vocals
Paul Bushnell - Bass Guitar, Backing Vocals
Matt Laug - Tambourine
3. Goin’ Down Swingin’ - 3:52 (Brian Ray/Oliver Leiber/David Gamson)
Brian Ray - Vocals, Backing Vocals, Guitar, Maracas
Oliver Leiber - Drums, Guitar, Maracas
David Gamson - Bass Guitar, Programming
4.Soft Machine (Featuring Etta James) - 4:01 (Brian Ray/Tonio K./Steve LeGassick)
Brian Ray - Vocals, Guitar
Matt Laug - Drums, Percussion
David Gamson - Bass Guitar, Backing Vocals
5. I Liked You Better - 3:18 (Brian Ray/Adam Cohen/Oliver Leiber)
Brian Ray - Vocals, Guitar
Matt Laug - Drums, Percussion
David Gamson - Bass Guitar, Backing Vocals
Russ Irwin - Backing Vocals
Jason Paige - Backing Vocals
6. All I Know - 4:27 (Brian Ray)
Brian Ray - Vocals, Harmonies, Guitar, Slide Guitar
Paul "Wix" Wickens - Mellotron
Rusty Anderson - Pedal Steel Guitar
Joe Zook - Tambourine
Scott Shriner - Bass Guitar, Backing Vocals
Abe Laboriel Jr. - Drums, Backing Vocals
7. Coming Up Roses - 3:54 (Brian Ray/Tonio K.)
Brian Ray - Vocals, Guitar
Abe Laboriel Jr. - Drums, Percussion
Paul Bushnell - Bass Guitar
Scott Shriner - Backing Vocals
David Gamson - Backing Vocals
The Dirt Brothers - Metal Vocals
8. Sub Atomic - 3:35 (Brian Ray/Abe Laboriel Jr.)
Brian Ray - Vocals, Backing Vocals, Guitar
Abe Laboriel Jr. - Drums, Tambourine
Scott Shriner - Bass Guitar
9. If You’re Leaving Me 3:45 (Brian Ray)
Brian Ray - Vocals, Acoustic Guitar, Percussion
Russ Irwin - String Arrangement, Strings, Mellotron, Organ
10. Anywhere But Home - 4:09 (Brian Ray)
Brian Ray - Vocals, Guitar
Matt Laug - Drums, Percussion
Scott Shriner - Backing Vocals
 Abe Laboriel Jr. - Backing Vocals
David Gamson - Bass Guitar

References

2006 albums